Gümeçbağlar is a village in the Palu District of Elazığ Province in Turkey.

Geography 
The village is 86 km from Elazig city center and 14 km from Palu town centre. Its elevation is 1,064 m.

Population

References

Villages in Palu District